In mathematics, a *-autonomous (read "star-autonomous") category C is a symmetric monoidal closed category equipped with a dualizing object . The concept is also referred to as Grothendieck—Verdier category in view of its relation to the notion of Verdier duality.

Definition

Let C be a symmetric monoidal closed category.

defined as the image by the bijection defining the monoidal closure

of the morphism

where  is the symmetry of the tensor product. An object  of the category C is called dualizing when the associated morphism  is an isomorphism for every object A of the category C. 

Equivalently, a *-autonomous category is a symmetric monoidal category C together with a functor  such that for every object A there is a natural isomorphism , and for every three objects A, B and C there is a natural bijection
.
The equivalence of the two definitions is shown by identifying  .

Properties

Compact closed categories are *-autonomous, with the monoidal unit as the dualizing object. Conversely, if the unit of a *-autonomous category is a dualizing object then there is a canonical family of maps

 .

These are all isomorphisms if and only if the *-autonomous category is compact closed.

Examples

A familiar example is the category of finite-dimensional vector spaces over any field k made monoidal with the usual tensor product of vector spaces.  The dualizing object is k, the one-dimensional vector space, and dualization corresponds to transposition. Although the category of all vector spaces over k is not *-autonomous, suitable extensions to categories of topological vector spaces can be made *-autonomous. 

On the other hand, the category of topological vector spaces contains an extremely wide full subcategory, the category Ste of stereotype spaces, which is a *-autonomous category with the dualizing object  and the tensor product . 

Various models of linear logic form *-autonomous categories, the earliest of which was Jean-Yves Girard's category of coherence spaces.

The category of complete semilattices with morphisms preserving all joins but not necessarily meets is *-autonomous with dualizer the chain of two elements.  A degenerate example (all homsets of cardinality at most one) is given by any Boolean algebra (as a partially ordered set) made monoidal using conjunction for the tensor product and taking 0 as the dualizing object.

The formalism of Verdier duality gives further examples of *-autonomous categories. For example,  mention that the bounded derived category of constructible l-adic sheaves on an algebraic variety has this property. Further examples include derived categories of constructible sheaves on various kinds of topological spaces.
 
An example of a self-dual category that is not *-autonomous is finite linear orders and continuous functions, which has * but is not autonomous: its dualizing object is the two-element chain but there is no tensor product.

The category of sets and their partial injections is self-dual because the converse of the latter is again a partial injection.

The concept of *-autonomous category was introduced by Michael Barr in 1979 in a monograph with that title.  Barr defined the notion for the more general situation of V-categories, categories enriched in a symmetric monoidal or autonomous category V.  The definition above specializes Barr's definition to the case V = Set of ordinary categories, those whose homobjects form sets (of morphisms).  Barr's monograph includes an appendix by his student Po-Hsiang Chu that develops the details of a construction due to Barr showing the existence of nontrivial *-autonomous V-categories for all symmetric monoidal categories V with pullbacks, whose objects became known a decade later as Chu spaces.

Non symmetric case

In a biclosed monoidal category C, not necessarily symmetric, it is still possible to define a dualizing object and then define a *-autonomous category as a biclosed monoidal category with a dualizing object. They are equivalent definitions, as in the symmetric case.

References
 
 
 
 

 

Monoidal categories
Closed categories